At least 19 people were killed by a girl aged about 10 in a suicide bombing attack.

References 

2015 murders in Nigeria
Mass murder in 2015
Terrorist incidents in Nigeria in 2015
January 2015 events in Nigeria
Suicide bombings in Nigeria